Nothobranchius janpapi is a species of killifish in the family Nothobranchiidae. It is endemic to the Ruvu and Rufiji rivers in  eastern Tanzania.  Its natural habitats are small pools and ponds situated on floodplains. The specific name honours the Dutch aquarist Jan Pap, who first discovered this species in 1975 and sent examples back to the Netherlands.

References

Links
 Nothobranchius janpapi on WildNothos 

janpapi
Endemic freshwater fish of Tanzania
Fish described in 1977
Taxonomy articles created by Polbot